Lejota aerea  (Loew 1872), the   Golden Trunksitter , is an uncommon species of syrphid fly observed in eastern North America. Hoverflies can remain nearly motionless in flight. The adults are also known as flower flies for they are commonly found on flowers, from which they get both energy-giving nectar and protein-rich pollen. The larvae of this genus are found in decaying tree roots.

Distribution
United States.

References

Eristalinae
Insects described in 1872
Diptera of North America
Hoverflies of North America
Taxa named by Hermann Loew